Mono Club is an English indie rock band from London, England. It is a musical collaboration between members of Goldheart Assembly and Lyla Foy. Their music has been described as 1960s psych and indie-pop. The Beatles and David Bowie are among their influences.

2018: Sky High and Submarine
On 23 March 2018, they released their debut album, Sky High and Submarine on LGM Records. The album comprises ten songs, including singles Sky High and Submarine, Memory Critical and Best Laid Plans.

Members
Mono Club are:

 John Herbert: lead vocals, guitar.
 Jake Bowser: keyboards, bass.
 Lyla Foy: backing vocals, bass.
 Dan Bell: rhythm guitar, backing vocals.
 Nicky Francis: drums.
 Kyle Hall: guitar.

Discography
Albums
 Sky High and Submarine (March 2018) LGM Records

References

External links
BBC Music: Mono Club

English indie rock groups